Aluminium 7010 alloy is a wrought aluminum alloy.  It is medium strength, having high corrosion and damage tolerance ability.

Chemical Composition

Physical Properties

Mechanical Properties

Other Designations 

 AMS 4203 
 AMS 4204 
 AMS 4205

Applications 
 Close die forgings for aerospace
 Forged bars for aerospace components
 High strength aerospace component

Features 
 High strength alloy
 High fatigue strength
 High Stress corrosion resistance
 Not for high temperature
 High Corrosion resistance

References

External links 
 microstructure
 What is aluminium 7010? - Quora
 apps.dtic.mil
 AA7010  Scientific.Net

Aluminium–zinc alloys